The Sidi Daoud massacre took place outside the village of Sidi Daoud near Sig in western Algeria on the night of 12 October 1997. 43 people were killed at a fake roadblock.

See also
List of massacres in Algeria

External links
Country Analysis- brief mention

Algerian massacres of the 1990s
1997 in Algeria
Massacres in 1997
Conflicts in 1997
October 1997 events in Africa